Shotogorka is a rural locality (a village) in Pirinemskoye Rural Settlement of Pinezhsky District, Arkhangelsk Oblast, Russia. The population was 126 as of 2010. There are 6 streets.

Geography 
Shotogorka is located 43 km northwest of Karpogory (the district's administrative centre) by road. Bereznik is the nearest rural locality.

References 

Rural localities in Pinezhsky District
Pinezhsky Uyezd